The Swift 40 is a South Korean cruising sailboat that was designed by the American design firm Sparkman & Stephens and first built in 1979.

The Swift 40 is a version of Sparkman & Stephens' design number 2134, as are the North Star 80/20 and the Hughes 40, with different decks and coach roof designs.

Production
The design was built by Kang Nam Shipbuilders in South Korea, from 1979 until 1984, but it is now out of production.

Design
The Swift 40 is a recreational keelboat, built predominantly of fiberglass, with wood trim. It has a masthead ketch rig with a keel-stepped mast, a raked stem, an angled transom, a skeg-mounted rudder controlled by a wheel and a fixed fin keel. It displaces  and carries  of lead ballast.

The boat is fitted with a British Perkins Engines diesel engine for docking and maneuvering.

The design has sleeping accommodation for seven people, with a double "V"-berth in the bow cabin, a straight settee berth and drop-down dinette table that forms a double berth in the main cabin and an aft cabin with a double "V"-berth. The galley is located on the port side just forward of the companionway ladder. The galley is "U"-shaped and is equipped with a three-burner stove and a sink. A navigation station is opposite the galley, on the starboard side. There are two heads, one just aft of the bow cabin on the port side and one on the port side in the aft cabin.

See also
List of sailing boat types

Related development
 Hughes 40
 North Star 80/20

References

External links
Photo of a Swift 40

Keelboats
1970s sailboat type designs
Sailing yachts
Sailboat type designs by Sparkman and Stephens
Sailboat types built by Kang Nam Shipbuilders